The 2017 Tiburon Challenger was a professional tennis tournament played on outdoor hard courts. It was the eleventh edition of the tournament which was part of the 2017 ATP Challenger Tour. It took place in Tiburon, United States between 25 September and 1 October 2017.

Singles main draw entrants

Seeds

 1 Rankings are as of September 18, 2017.

Other entrants
The following players received wildcards into the singles main draw:
  Tom Fawcett
  Christian Harrison
  Wayne Montgomery
  Alexander Sarkissian

The following players received entry into the singles main draw as special exempts:
  Frank Dancevic
  Alexander Ward

The following player received entry into the singles main draw using a protected ranking:
  Alejandro González

The following players received entry from the qualifying draw:
  Sekou Bangoura
  Deiton Baughman
  Evan King
  Kaichi Uchida

The following players received entry as lucky losers:
  Jan Choinski
  Filip Peliwo
  Tim Smyczek

Champions

Singles

 Cameron Norrie def.  Tennys Sandgren 6–2, 6–3.

Doubles

 André Göransson /  Florian Lakat def.  Marcelo Arévalo /  Miguel Ángel Reyes-Varela 6–4, 6–4.

References 

Tiburon Challenger
2017
2017 in American tennis
2017 in sports in California